A. rosea may refer to:

 Acrasis rosea, a heterolobosean species
 Aerides rosea, an orchid species
 Alcea rosea, the hollyhock, an ornamental plant species
 Antennaria rosea, the rosy pussytoes, a flowering plant species
 Atriplex rosea, the tumbling saltbush, red orach or tumbling orach, a saltbush species

Synonyms
 Achatinella rosea, a synonym for Achatinella bulimoides
 Aranea rosea, a synonym for Micrommata virescens
 Arethusa rosea, a synonym for Bletia purpurata
 Athelia rosea, a synonym for Laeticorticium roseum

See also
 Rosea (disambiguation)